Theretra incarnata is a moth of the  family Sphingidae.

Distribution 
It is known from Indonesia and Australia.

References

Theretra
Moths described in 1903